Parchim station is a railway station in the municipality of Parchim, located in the Ludwigslust-Parchim district in Mecklenburg-Vorpommern, Germany.

Notable places nearby
Parchim International Airport

References

Railway stations in Mecklenburg-Western Pomerania
Buildings and structures in Ludwigslust-Parchim